Mühlbach is a creek of Hesse, Germany.

It is about 5 kilometres long and one of the headstreams of the Merkenfritzerbach (the other being the Gänsbach). Some consider the Gänsbach being the upper part of the Merkenfritzerbach and thus the Mühlbach a tributary.

See also
List of rivers of Hesse

Rivers of Hesse
Rivers of Germany